Shumlai is a town, and one of twenty union councils in Battagram District, in Khyber Pakhtunkhwa province of Pakistan. It is located at 34°42'20N 73°7'0E and has an altitude of 1567 metres (5144 feet).

References

Union councils of Battagram District
Populated places in Battagram District